Enemy Mine may refer to:
 Enemy Mine (novella), a 1979 science fiction novella by Barry B. Longyear
 Enemy Mine (film), a 1985 film based on the novella
 "Enemy Mine" (Stargate SG-1), a 2003 episode of the sci-fi TV series Stargate SG-1
 Enemy Mine (album), a 2009 album by indie rock band Swan Lake

See also
Enemy (disambiguation)
My Enemy (disambiguation)